Carlos Federico Puppo Gross (born 6 December 1986) is a Uruguayan footballer.

Club career
Federico Puppo began his career in the youth ranks of Montevideo Wanderers and made his first team debut in 2004. In 2006, he moved to 
Uruguayan Primera División rivals River Plate.
While with River he made 57 league appearances and scored 37 goals. He helped River win the 2008 Clausura championship and was a key player in the club's historic run to the Copa Sudamericana 2009 semifinals. In 2011, he joined Danubio, and made 10 appearances scoring 5 goals as the club finished second during the 2011 Apertura campaign.

On 11 January 2012 it was announced that Puppo had signed with Chicago Fire in Major League Soccer.

Puppo struggled in his first season with Chicago, and was loaned out to Defensor Sporting on 23 July 2012 for the remainder of 2012.

On 26 January 2013, Puppo was loaned out to LDU Quito for the 2013 season.

On 24 February 2014 Chicago Fire and Puppo have mutually agreed to terminate the contract.

International career
In 2011, Puppo was named to participate for the Uruguay national football team under-22 squad at the 2011 Pan American Games.

References

External links
 Profile at soccerway
 Profile at BDFA
(in English) https://www.mlssoccer.com/players/federico-puppo

1986 births
Living people
Uruguayan footballers
Uruguayan expatriate footballers
Association football forwards
Footballers at the 2011 Pan American Games
People from Colonia Department
People from Colonia del Sacramento
Montevideo Wanderers F.C. players
Danubio F.C. players
Chicago Fire FC players
L.D.U. Quito footballers
Defensor Sporting players
Club Atlético River Plate (Montevideo) players
Centro Atlético Fénix players
Plaza Colonia players
Expatriate soccer players in the United States
Expatriate footballers in Ecuador
Uruguayan Primera División players
Ecuadorian Serie A players
Major League Soccer players
Designated Players (MLS)
Pan American Games medalists in football
Pan American Games bronze medalists for Uruguay
Uruguayan expatriate sportspeople in Ecuador
Medalists at the 2011 Pan American Games